Vitaliy Oleksandrovych Voitsekhirskyi (born 4 July 1967) is a Ukrainian politician currently serving as a People's Deputy of Ukraine representing Ukraine's 197th electoral district from Servant of the People since 2021. He previously served as mayor of Zolotonosha from 2010 to 2021.

Early life and career 
He served in the Soviet Armed Forces from 1986 to 1988 before graduating from the Kyiv National Economic University in 1990 with a specialisation in accounting, control, and analysis of economic activity. The same year, he began working at KyivMetroBud.

In 1991, Voitsekhirskyi began working at Zlatohor distillery in Zolotonosha Raion, and steadily worked his way up from an accountant to the distillery's general director. In addition, he is also an amateur volleyball master, and, prior to his election, was a candidate for Master of Sports of Ukraine.

Political career 
In the 2010 Ukrainian local elections, Voitsekhirskyi was first elected to the office of mayor of the city of Zolotonosha, located in eastern Cherkasy Oblast. In this election, he was part of the Union, Chornobyl, Ukraine Social and Ecological Party. He was subsequently re-elected twice: the first time during the 2015 Ukrainian local elections as part of the Petro Poroshenko Bloc, and the second time in the 2020 Ukrainian local elections as part of Servant of the People. In his 2020 re-election, he received a clear majority, with 55.67% of voters supporting him.

Following the resignation of Oleksandr Skichko as a People's Deputy of Ukraine to become Governor of Cherkasy Oblast, Voitsekhirskyi was selected as the candidate of Servant of the People to fill his position as People's Deputy of Ukraine from Ukraine's 197th electoral district. At the time of the election, he was an independent. Voitsekhirskyi won out, winning with 46.95% of the vote. Holub was the next-closest candidate, bringing in 25.44% of the vote.

In the Verkhovna Rada (Ukraine's parliament), he joined the Servant of the People faction. He was additionally appointed to the Verkhovna Rada Committee on Organisation of State Power and Local-Self Government on 28 July 2022. In his position on the committee, he was criticised by anti-corruption non-governmental organisation Chesno for his 5 September 2022 vote in favour of a bill claimed by Chesno to curtail the powers of state anti-corruption authorities and reduce the number of people competing for leadership of the National Anti-Corruption Bureau.

References 

1967 births
Living people
Ninth convocation members of the Verkhovna Rada
Kyiv National Economic University alumni
People from Kharkiv Oblast
Petro Poroshenko Bloc politicians
Servant of the People (political party) politicians